Weibin District , is a district of Baoji, Shaanxi, China.

Administrative divisions
As 2020, this District is divided to 5 subdistricts and 5 towns.
Subdistricts

Towns

References

Districts of Shaanxi
Baoji